Cikadu is a large village in Watukumpul district, Pemalang Regency in Central Java province, Indonesia. Its population is 6515.

Climate
Cikadu has a very wet tropical rainforest climate (Af) with heavy rainfall from May to September and very heavy to extremely heavy rainfall from October to April.

References

 Populated places in Central Java